Sylvie Robineau (born May 23, 1956 in Dakar) is a New Caledonian politician.  She has served in the Congress of New Caledonia as a member of The Rally-UMP.

References

1956 births
Living people
Members of the Congress of New Caledonia
New Caledonian women in politics
The Rally (New Caledonia) politicians
People from Dakar
21st-century French women politicians